Amando G. Dayrit (1912–1944) was born in San Jose, San Fernando, Pampanga to Florentino Singian Dayrit and Juana Gatchalian Galang. A prolific writer and columnist, he was author of the renowned "Tribune" column "Good Morning Judge".  During the Japanese Occupation, he contributed to the underground "Free Philippines".  He contracted tuberculosis in his pursuit of freedom and was under house arrest in Manila.  He was later allowed to return to San Fernando where he died shortly after.

References

1912 births
1944 deaths
Filipino journalists
Kapampangan people
People from San Fernando, Pampanga
20th-century journalists
20th-century deaths from tuberculosis
Tuberculosis deaths in the Philippines